The New Adventures of Hitler was a comic series written by Grant Morrison and drawn by Steve Yeowell which first appeared in Cut, a Scottish arts magazine in 1989 before being reprinted in the anthology Crisis in 1990.

Publication history
The New Adventures of Hitler was a satirical and surreal (one scene has Hitler opening a cupboard to find Morrissey singing "Heaven Knows I'm Miserable Now") strip based on the claims of Hitler's sister-in-law Bridget Dowling that Hitler had lived with her, her husband Alois Hitler, Jr., and her son William Patrick Hitler in Liverpool from 1912 to 1913. It first appeared in Cut, a Scottish arts and culture magazine and became instantly controversial, and some accused Morrison of being a Nazi due to their use of Hitler in what was essentially a humorous story. 

Cut ceased publication before the entire strip was published, but The New Adventures of Hitler was printed in its entirety in Crisis in 1990.

Crisis was a spin-off from 2000 AD which printed more adult-oriented work and The New Adventures of Hitler fit in with the themes of the magazine. However the controversy which had surrounded the story in Cut continued with the strip's reprinting in Crisis. The story ran from Crisis in issues 46-49 and a proposed collected edition by IPC never appeared. Morrison themselves had planned to set up their own imprint to self-publish some of their work, including The New Adventures of Hitler, but nothing came of the idea.

See also
Adolf Hitler in popular culture

Notes

References

The New Adventures of Hitler at 2000 AD online

External links
Grant Morrison homepage

Cultural depictions of Adolf Hitler
1989 comics debuts
Comics based on real people
Satirical comics
Black comedy comics
Surreal comedy
Crisis (Fleetway) comic strips